This is an alphabetical list of populated places in Swabi District, Khyber Pakhtunkhwa, Pakistan. It includes villages, towns, and union councils.

Towns and union councils 

 Adina
 Anbar
 Bachai
 Batakara
 Beka
 Chak Noda
 Dagai
 Dobian
 Gandaf
 Gani Chatra
 Gasbasni
 Ismaila
 Jalsai
 Jhanda
 Kabgani
 Kalabat
 Kalu Khan
 Karnal Sher Kallay
 Kotha
 Lahor
 Lahor Gharbi
 Lahor Sharqi
 Maniri Payan
 Manki
 Marghuz
 Mathani Changan
 Naranji
 Pabeni
 Panjpir
 Parmoli
 Saleem Khan
 Sard Cheena
 Shah Mansur
 Shamansoor
 Sheikh Jana
 Shewa Adda
 Shiekh Jana
 Sudhir
 Swabi (district headquarters)
 Swabi Maniri
 Tarakai
 Thand Kohi
 Thordher
 Topi East
 Topi West
 Topi
 Tordher
 Yar Hussain
 Yar Hussain (Union Council East)
 Yar Hussain (Union Council West)
 Zarobi

Tehsils, villages and other settlements 

 Ambar
 Asota
 Bam Khel
 Charbagh
 Farooq Banda
 Gar Munara
 Hund
 Jabar
 Jalbai
 Jehangira
 Kaddi
 Khoro Swabi
 Khunda
 Lahor Tehsil
 Maini
 Mehr Ali
 Pabaini
 Razar Tehsil
 Shewa
 Swabi Tehsil
 Thandkoi
 Topi Tehsil
 Turlandi
 Yaqubi
 Zaida

Populated places in Swabi District
Swabi